Charles I of Monaco (died 15 August 1357), Lord of Monaco, was a 14th century soldier and noble. He was a member of the Grimaldi dynasty.

Biography
The oldest son of Rainier I by his first wife, Salvatica del Carretto, Charles was forced to flee into exile following the Rock of Monaco falling into Genoese control on April 10, 1301.

He was appointed Admiral of France.

After thirty years of Genoese rule, Charles retook the Rock on 12 September 1331, and ruled until his death, when the Rock was again conquered by the Genoese army. 

Also he was Baron of San Demetrio,  in the Kingdom of Naples.

In 1346 he acquired the Lordship of Menton and, in 1355, he conquered the Lordship of Roquebrune.

On 29 June 1352, Charles designed a co-rulership of Monaco between his uncle Antonio (his father's youngest brother), and his own sons, Rainier II and Gabriele.

Family
Charles I married Lucchina Spinola, a daughter of Girardo Spinola, Lord of Dertonne. They had eight children:

Louis, his successor.
Rainier II
Francesco
Gabriele, married to a member of the Orsini family
Charles, Co-Lord of Mentone; he had a son, Luca, who inherited Mentone. Luca had two sons, Pietro and Filippo, also Lords of Mentone; both brothers died without issue, and Mentone passed to the older branch of the family.
Lancelot
Ruffo
Anastasia

Notes

References
 Françoise de Bernardy, Princes of Monaco: the remarkable history of the Grimaldi family, ed. Barker, 1961.

1357 deaths
14th-century Lords of Monaco
House of Grimaldi
Lords of Monaco
Year of birth unknown
Admirals of France